Sarjelu (also Romanized as Sārjelū, Sārjalū, and Sarjelū) is a village in Hendudur Rural District, Sarband District, Shazand County, Markazi Province, Iran. At the 2006 census, its population was 95, in 19 families.

References 

Populated places in Shazand County